

Infantry 
1st Regiment Connecticut Volunteer Infantry (3 months)
2nd Regiment Connecticut Volunteer Infantry (3 months)
3rd Regiment Connecticut Volunteer Infantry (3 months)
4th Regiment Connecticut Volunteer Infantry
5th Regiment Connecticut Volunteer Infantry
6th Regiment Connecticut Volunteer Infantry
7th Regiment Connecticut Volunteer Infantry
8th Regiment Connecticut Volunteer Infantry
9th Regiment Connecticut Volunteer Infantry
10th Regiment Connecticut Volunteer Infantry
11th Regiment Connecticut Volunteer Infantry
12th Regiment Connecticut Volunteer Infantry
13th Regiment Connecticut Volunteer Infantry
14th Regiment Connecticut Volunteer Infantry
15th Regiment Connecticut Volunteer Infantry
16th Regiment Connecticut Volunteer Infantry
17th Regiment Connecticut Volunteer Infantry
18th Regiment Connecticut Volunteer Infantry
19th Regiment Connecticut Volunteer Infantry
20th Regiment Connecticut Volunteer Infantry
21st Regiment Connecticut Volunteer Infantry
22nd Regiment Connecticut Volunteer Infantry
23rd Regiment Connecticut Volunteer Infantry
24th Regiment Connecticut Volunteer Infantry
25th Regiment Connecticut Volunteer Infantry
26th Regiment Connecticut Volunteer Infantry
27th Regiment Connecticut Volunteer Infantry
28th Regiment Connecticut Volunteer Infantry
29th Regiment Connecticut Volunteer Infantry (African Descent)
30th Regiment Connecticut Volunteer Infantry (African Descent) - four companies organized in March 1864; consolidated with the 31st United States Colored Infantry on May 18, 1864

Cavalry 
1st Regiment Connecticut Volunteer Cavalry
1st Squadron, Connecticut Cavalry

Artillery 
1st Connecticut Heavy Artillery Regiment
2nd Connecticut Heavy Artillery Regiment
1st Connecticut Light Artillery Battery
2nd Connecticut Light Artillery Battery
3rd Connecticut Light Artillery Battery

References 
The Civil War Archive

See also 
Lists of American Civil War Regiments by State

 
Connecticut
Civil War